Olivia Hooker may refer to:
 Olivia Hooker (psychologist) the namesake of a Sentinel class cutter
 USCGC Olivia Hooker a Sentinel class cutter